The 1969 Chico State Wildcats football team represented Chico State College—now known as California State University, Chico—as a member of the Far Western Conference (FWC) during the 1969 NCAA College Division football season. Led by second-year head coach Pete Riehlman, Chico State compiled an overall record of 8–2 with a mark of 3–2 in conference play, placing third in the FWC. The team outscored its opponents 271 to 121 for the season. The Wildcats played home games at College Field in Chico, California.

Schedule

Team players in the NFL
No Chico State players were selected in the 1970 NFL Draft.

The following finished their Chico State career in 1969, were not drafted, but played in the NFL.

References

Chico State
Chico State Wildcats football seasons
Chico State Wildcats football